Erin Taylor Foster is an American writer, performer and entrepreneur.

Career
Foster was a writer on the NBC sitcom The New Normal. With her sister Sara Foster, she created the TV series Barely Famous on VH1. It is a mockumentary satire of reality TV, and first aired in March 2015.

Since 2017, Foster and her sister Sara Foster are creative heads for the dating app Bumble, and collaborated with clothing brand Sub Urban Riot to create a line of T-shirts and sweatpants.

Personal life
Foster is the daughter of record producer David Foster and former model Rebecca Dyer. On December 31, 2019, Foster wed Simon Tikhman in Nashville, Tennessee, with Foster's stepmother Katharine McPhee performing at their wedding. Foster converted to Judaism prior to her marriage to Tikhman.

Filmography 

 The $100,000 Pyramid (2018) - Herself
 Barely Famous (2015) – Herself
 Candidly Nicole (2014) – Herself/Nicole's friend
 Still Waiting... (2009) – Kristy
 Castle (2009) – Skye Blue
 He's Such a Girl (2007) – Tara Peters
 The O.C. (TV, 2005-2006) – Heather
 The Darkroom (2006) – Kimberly
 House (TV, 2005) – Dr. Petra Gilmar/Second Applicant
 American Dreams (TV, 2005) – Sky
 Gilmore Girls – Cheryl
 Cellular (2004) – Surf Girl
 Reno 911! (TV, 2004) – Garcia's Hooker
 CSI: Crime Scene Investigation (TV, 2004) – Crackhead Girl
 Judging Amy (TV, 2002) – Gerry
 Roswell (TV, 2002) – Susie

References

External links 
 

Living people
20th-century American actresses
21st-century American actresses
Actresses from Los Angeles
American film actresses
American television actresses
American television writers
American women television writers
Converts to Judaism
Jewish American actresses
Jewish American writers
American LGBT actors
LGBT people from California
American LGBT writers
Screenwriters from California
Writers from Los Angeles
21st-century American Jews
Year of birth missing (living people)